The 2000 FIFA Club World Championship was the inaugural FIFA Club World Cup, the world club championship for men's club association football teams. It took place in Brazil from 5 to 14 January 2000. FIFA as football's international governing body selected Brazil as the host nation on 8 June 1999 as the bid was found to be the strongest among four candidates. The draw was made at the Copacabana Palace in Rio de Janeiro on 14 October 1999. All matches were played in either Rio de Janeiro's Estádio do Maracanã or São Paulo's Estádio do Morumbi.

Eight teams, two from South America, two from Europe and one each from North America, Africa, Asia and Oceania entered the tournament. The first Club World Cup match took place in São Paulo, and saw Spanish club Real Madrid beat Saudi Arabian side Al-Nassr 3–1; Real Madrid's Nicolas Anelka scored the first goal in Club World Cup history in the 21st minute. Later the same day, Corinthians goalkeeper Dida kept the first clean sheet in the tournament as his team beat Moroccan side Raja Casablanca 2–0.

Corinthians and Vasco da Gama each won their respective groups to qualify for the final. In front of a crowd of 73,000, the final finished as a 0–0 draw after extra time. The title was decided by a penalty shoot-out which Corinthians won 4–3.
As winners, Corinthians received $6 million in prize money, while Vasco da Gama received $5 million. Necaxa beat Real Madrid in the match for third place to claim $4 million. Real Madrid received $3 million, and the other remaining teams were awarded $2.5 million.

Host bids
Initially, there were nine candidates to host the competition: China, Brazil, Mexico, Paraguay, Saudi Arabia, Tahiti, Turkey, the United States and Uruguay; of the nine, only Saudi Arabia, Mexico, Brazil and Uruguay confirmed their interest to FIFA. On 7 June 1999, the FIFA Emergency Committee appointed Brazil as hosts of the competition during their meeting in Cairo, Egypt.

Qualified teams

The clubs that played in the tournament were:

Venues

Squads
For a list of the squads at the 2000 FIFA Club World Championship, see 2000 FIFA Club World Championship squads.

Match officials
Eight referees were appointed from the six continental confederations, each along with an accompanying assistant referee.

Format
Matches were played in São Paulo and Rio de Janeiro. The teams were organised in two groups of four teams, with the top team in each group going through to the final and the two second-placed teams contesting a match for third place.

Group stage

Group A

Group B

Knockout stage

Match for third place

Final

Goalscorers

1 own goal
 Fahad Al-Bishi (Al-Nassr, against Raja Casablanca)

Awards

The following awards were given at the conclusion of the tournament.

Additionally, FIFA named an all-star team consisting of eleven starters and seven substitutes.

Notes

References

External links
FIFA Club World Championship Brazil 2000, FIFA.com
FIFA Technical Report
FIFA Statistics
Tournament details at the Rec.Sports.Soccer Statistics Foundation (RSSSF)

 
2000
2000
2000 in association football
2000 in Brazilian football
1999–2000 in Mexican football
1999–2000 in Spanish football
1999–2000 in English football
1999–2000 in Saudi Arabian football
1999–2000 in Moroccan football
2000 in Australian soccer